Sprained Ankle is the debut studio album by American singer-songwriter Julien Baker. Originally self-released on Bandcamp as an EP, the album was re-released in October 2015 on 6131 Records. The album went on to receive critical acclaim and placed on several lists of the best albums of 2015 and the 2010s as a whole. In 2020, Paste listed it as one of the best indie folk albums of all time. It is considered an influential work, with one retrospective review stating "In the half-decade since its initial release, Baker’s name has become synonymous with the revitalization of ultra-personal singer-songwriters wearing their hearts on their sleeves."

Development 
The songs on Sprained Ankle were written by Baker when she was a student at MTSU. She thought that her songwriting at the time didn't "fit the vibe of Forrister" (her previous band) and didn't intend to release them as an album. Her friend, Michael Hegner, had free time at MTSU's studio and offered to record her songs. They made a demo, Hegner liked it, and they kept working together. In the summer of 2014, they decided to take a road trip to Spacebomb Studios in Richmond, Virginia where Hegner was interning to record it. In an interview with The Blue Indian, Baker said that "it was recorded really sparsely and efficiently to get the most out of the time there, which contributed to the way the songs come across." The songs “Vessels” and “Brittle Boned” were later recorded by her friend, Toby Landers and added to the album.

The record was first released as an EP on Bandcamp in the winter of 2014. Its first cover art was designed by Baker and a friend. People started sharing the record, then Baker toured it and sold CDs. 6131 Records liked her work and decided to sign her. The record was taken down from Bandcamp on advice from Baker's label so it could be mastered and formally released.

Composition 
Sprained Ankle is a folk and indie folk album with elements of emo, lo-fi, and country. It is "made of sparse guitar (and piano) tunes about breakups, substance abuse, loneliness, physical and emotional pain, and enduring" The album was written mostly in a soundproof booth in Middle Tennessee State University, where Baker was a student at the time. It was recorded "one-mic and one-take", with an intimacy that "feels like a violation of her privacy". "Go Home" features suicidal imagery and incorporates the hymn "In Christ Alone" and "bits of 'church radio' that accidentally fed into her preamp during recording".

Critical reception 

The mastered versions of the songs "Sprained Ankle" (title track), "Something", and "Brittle Boned" premiered in advance on NPR's All Songs Considered, Stereogum, and Nylon respectively. Sprained Ankle was re-release in October 2015 through 6131 Records. The Sabyn Mayfield-directed music video for "Sprained Ankle" was released on October 26. It charted on Billboards Heatseekers Albums at number 25 for the week of November 14.

Gabriela Tully Claymore from Stereogum wrote the songs were "unabashedly explicit, and Sprained Ankle discusses depression, substance abuse, and general crises of faith in detail." On the guitar playing, Ian Cohen of Pitchfork wrote that "[Baker is] a minimalist, playing bassy clusters of melodic thirds, flicking silvery harmonics, [and] palm-muting chords." It was recorded in a way that Adam Kevil from Consequence of Sound considers to be a simple format, "[Baker] alone, singing and playing acoustic guitar directly into the microphone, sometimes in a single take".

Track listing

Personnel
Credits for Sprained Ankle adapted from Bandcamp and AllMusic.

Julien Baker - composer, primary artist
Michael Hegner - recording engineer (except for tracks 3 and 8)
Cody Landers - recording engineer (for tracks 3 and 8)
Josh Bonati - mastering engineer
Jake Cunningham - cover photography

References

2015 debut albums
Julien Baker albums